Hermann von Barth (5 June 1845 – 7 December 1876) was a famous German mountaineer.

Life and career 
Hermann von Barth was born on 5 June 1845 at Eurasburg Castle. He initially studied law in Munich, where he was affiliated to the Corps Franconia. As a junior lawyer he began in 1868 in Berchtesgaden to explore the still largely unconquered Berchtesgaden Alps. From 1873 he studied natural sciences and, in 1876, deranged by fever, he committed suicide whilst on a research expedition in Africa. He died on 7 December 1876 in São Paulo de Loanda, Portuguese Angola.

Von Barth is most well known for his exploration of the Karwendel mountains. In summer 1870 he climbed, alone, 88 peaks (12 for the first time, including the Birkkarspitze, Kaltwasserkarspitze, Lalidererspitze, Große Seekarspitze, Grubenkarspitze, Dreizinkenspitze, Eastern Karwendelspitze, Vogelkarspitze, Wörner, Kuhkopf).

In 1871 he switched to the Wetterstein mountains and was the first to climb many peaks there as well. By 1869 he had explored the Allgäu Alps, climbing 44 summits, 3 of which were previously unconquered.  He typically climbed alone.

In 1874 he published the book Aus den Nördlichen Kalkalpen ("From the Northern Limestone Alps"), in which he documented his experiences and tours. The work is viewed today as a classic amongst Alpine literature.

Legacy 
The names of numerous mountain huts, trails, etc., are witness to the services of Hermann von Barth in opening up the Northern Limestone Alps: 
 the Barthgrat (the crossing from the Katzenkopf to the Middle Jägerkarspitze (III), Karwendel, first conquered by Barth, unaided and alone, in 1870);
 Barthspitze (Karwendel, named in his honour) and Barthkamin (Risser Falk, Karwendel, first climbed in 1870 by von Barth);
 the protected climb from the Meilerhütte hut on the Partenkirchen Dreitorspitze is also called the Hermann von Barth Way.

References

Sources 
Rudolf Gombart, Paul Martin: Dem Bergsteiger und Afrikaforscher Dr. Hermann Frh. v. Barth zu Hamarting Franconiae München (xx,FM) zum Gedächtnis. Einst und Jetzt 10 (1965), p. 143-145
 Hermann von Barth: Aus den Nördlichen Kalkalpen. Ersteigungen und Erlebnisse. Süddeutscher Verlag, München 1984,  (out of print)
 Hermann von Barth: Aus den Nördlichen Kalkalpen; Ersteigungen und Erlebnisse in den Gebirgen Berchtesgadens, des Allgäu, des Innthales, des Isar-Quellengebietes und des Wettersteins; Mit erläuternden Beiträgen zur Orographie und Hypsometrie der Nördlichen Kalkalpen, Mit lythographierten Gebirgsprofilen und Horizontalprojectionen nach Original-Skizzen des Verfassers. Eduard Amthor, Gera 1874. XXIV, 637, 22 tables and 5 folding tables with several illustrations, (facsimile) Fines Mundi Verlag, Saarbrücken 2008. PDF, 86 MB
 Carl Bünsch, Max Rohrer (Hrsg.): Gesammelte Schriften des Freiherrn Hermann von Barth. Alpine Verlagsanstalt, München 1926.
 Ewald Weiß: "Einsam auf einem Fels zu thronen". Das kometenhafte Leben des Hermann von Barth, Freiherr von und zu Harmating. In: Panorama. 6/2000. Deutscher Alpenverein e.V., p. 42–44,  - Link
 "Hermann von Barth (eine Auswahl)": Herausgegeben vom Hauptausschuss des Deutschen und Österreichischen Alpenvereins als erster Band der Reihe "Erschließer der Berge", München 1926

External links 

 Porträt Hermann von Barth in DAV Panorama Nr. 6/2000
 
 Liste der Erstbesteigungen (auszugsweise)
Excerpts from publications
 Bergruf.de Das vollständige Kapitel Berchtesgadener Alpen aus dem Buch Aus den Nördlichen Kalkalpen (1874) und mehr
 Wanderpfa.de Tourenberichte der Allgäuer Alpen aus dem Buch Aus den Nördlichen Kalkalpen und mehr
 Im Roßloch - Grubenkarspitze, Dreizinkenspitze, Laliderer Wand und Spitze, Bockkarspitze (aus dem Alpenfreund 1875)
 Ein Tag auf den Spitzen der Hinterautaler Kette - Birkkar-, Ödkar-, Marxenkar- und Seekarspitze (aus der Zeitschrift des Deutschen Alpenvereins 1870/71) 
 Aus dem Quellen-Gebiete der Isar. XIX. Der Grosse Karwendelspitz. Aus den Nördlichen Kalkalpen (1874), Gera 1874 S. 420 ff.

1845 births
1876 deaths
1870s suicides
People from Bad Tölz-Wolfratshausen
People from the Kingdom of Bavaria
German mountain climbers
Ludwig Maximilian University of Munich alumni
Suicides in Angola